Arlington is a former community in Inverness Citrus County, Florida, United States.

Overview 
Arlington was a farming community. In Arlington it was originally known as Proveville because the settlers here had to live on land for a certain amount of time before it was their possession. The town in its heyday had about 50 residents in 1881, a school, a church and a sawmill. Residents here were mostly farmers and grew pineapples, Oranges and bananas. Arlington's name most likely came from Arlington, Virginia.

References

Former populated places in Citrus County, Florida